Walter Ernst Paul Ulbricht (30 June 18931 August 1973) was a German communist politician. Ulbricht played a leading role in the creation of the Weimar-era Communist Party of Germany (KPD) and later (after spending the years of Nazi rule in exile in France and the Soviet Union) in the early development and establishment of the German Democratic Republic. As the First Secretary of the Socialist Unity Party from 1950 to 1971, he was the chief decision-maker in East Germany. From President Wilhelm Pieck's death in 1960 on, he was also the East German head of state until his own death in 1973. As the leader of a significant Communist satellite, Ulbricht had a degree of bargaining power with the Kremlin that he used effectively. For example, he demanded the building of the Berlin Wall in 1961 when the Kremlin was reluctant.

Ulbricht began his political life during the German Empire, when he joined first the Social Democratic Party of Germany (SPD) in 1912, the anti-World War I Independent Social Democratic Party of Germany (USPD) in 1917 and deserted the Imperial German Army in 1918. He joined the Communist Party of Germany in 1920 and became a leading party functionary, serving in its Central Committee from 1923 onward. After the Nazi takeover of Germany in 1933 and the 1934 exposure of his role in ordering the 1931 murder of Paul Anlauf and Franz Lenck, Ulbricht lived in Paris and Prague from 1933 to 1937 and in the Soviet Union from 1937 to 1945.

After the end of World War II, Ulbricht re-organized the German Communist Party in the Soviet occupation zone along Stalinist lines. He played a key role in the forcible merger of the KPD and SPD into the Socialist Unity Party of Germany (SED) in 1946. He became the First Secretary of the SED and effective leader of the recently established East Germany in 1950. The Soviet Army occupation force violently suppressed the uprising of 1953 in East Germany on 17 June 1953, while Ulbricht hid in the Soviet Army headquarters in Berlin-Karlshorst. East Germany joined the Soviet-controlled Warsaw Pact upon its founding in 1955. Ulbricht presided over the total suppression of civil and political rights in the East German state, which functioned as a communist-ruled dictatorship from its founding in 1949 onward.

The nationalization of East German industry under Ulbricht failed to raise the standard of living to a level comparable to that of West Germany. The result was massive emigration, with hundreds of thousands of people fleeing the country to the west every year in the 1950s. When Soviet Premier Nikita Khrushchev gave permission for a wall to stop the outflow in Berlin, Ulbricht had the Berlin Wall built in 1961, which triggered a diplomatic crisis but succeeded in curtailing emigration. The failures of Ulbricht's New Economic System and Economic System of Socialism from 1963 to 1970 led to his forcible retirement for "health reasons" and replacement as First Secretary in 1971 by Erich Honecker with Soviet approval. Ulbricht suffered a stroke and died in 1973.

Early years

Ulbricht was born in 1893 in Leipzig, Saxony, to Pauline Ida (née Rothe) and Ernst August Ulbricht, an impoverished tailor. He spent eight years in primary school (Volksschule) and this constituted all of his formal education since he left school to train as a joiner. Both his parents worked actively for the Social Democratic Party (SPD), which Walter joined in 1912. The young Ulbricht first learned about radical socialism at home then in Leipzig's Naundörfchen workers' district.

First World War and the German Revolution
Ulbricht served in the Imperial German Army during World War I from 1915 to 1917 in Galicia, on the Eastern Front, and in the Balkans. He deserted the Army in 1918, as he had opposed the war from the beginning. Imprisoned in Charleroi, in 1918 he was released as part of the collapse of Imperial Germany.

In 1917 he became a member of the Independent Social Democratic Party (USPD) after it split off from the Social Democratic Party over support of Germany's participation in World War I.

During the German Revolution of 1918, Ulbricht became a member of the soldier's soviet of his army corps. In 1919, he joined the Spartakusbund and became one of the founding members of the KPD.

The Weimar years
Along with the bulk of the USPD, he joined the KPD in 1920 and became one of its active organizers. He rose fast in the ranks of the KPD, becoming a member of the Central Committee in 1923. Ulbricht was an adherent of the Lenin model, which favored a highly centralized party. Ulbricht attended the International Lenin School of the Comintern in Moscow in 1924/1925. He came home in 1926 and went on to assist the newly appointed party chief Ernst Thälmann. The electors subsequently voted him into the regional parliament of Saxony (Sächsischer Landtag) in 1926. He became a Member of the Reichstag for South Westphalia from 1928 to 1933 and served as KPD chairman in Berlin and Brandenburg from 1929.

In the years before the 1933 Nazi election to power, paramilitary wings of Marxist and extreme nationalist parties provoked massive riots connected with demonstrations. Besides the Berlin Police, the KPD's arch-enemies were street-fighters like the Nazi Party's SA, the Monarchist German National People's Party's Stahlhelm, and Stormtroopers affiliated with "radical nationalist parties". The Social Democratic Party of Germany and its paramilitary Reichsbanner forces, which dominated local and national politics from 1918 to 1931 and which the KPD accused of "Social fascism", was their most detested foe. Ulbricht quickly became a KPD functionary and this was attributed to the Bolshevization of the party.

At an event arranged by the Nazi Party on 22 January 1931, Ulbricht was allowed by Joseph Goebbels, the Nazi Party's Gauleiter of Berlin and Brandenburg, to give a speech. Subsequently, Goebbels delivered his own speech. The attempt at a friendly discussion turned hostile and became a debate. A struggle between Nazis and Communists began: police officers divided them. Both sides had tried to use this event for their election propaganda. The brawl took two hours to disperse and over a hundred were injured in the melee.

The Bülowplatz Murders

During the last days of the Weimar Republic, the KPD had a policy of assassinating two Berlin police officers in retaliation for every KPD member killed by the police.

On 2 August 1931, KPD Members of the Reichstag Heinz Neumann and Hans Kippenberger received a dressing down from Ulbricht, who was the Party's leader in the Berlin-Brandenburg region. Enraged by police interference and by Neumann and Kippenberger's failure to follow the policy, Ulbricht snarled, "At home in Saxony we would have done something about the police a long time ago. Here in Berlin we will not fool around much longer. Soon we will hit the police in the head."

Enraged by Ulbricht's words, Kippenberger and Neumann decided to assassinate Paul Anlauf, the forty-two-year-old Captain of the Berlin Police's Seventh Precinct. Captain Anlauf, a widower with three daughters, had been nicknamed Schweinebacke, or "Pig Face" by the KPD.

According to John Koehler, "Of all the policemen in strife-torn Berlin, the reds hated Anlauf the most. His precinct included the area around KPD headquarters, which made it the most dangerous in the city. The captain almost always led the riot squads that broke up illegal rallies of the Communist Party."

Nazi and war years

The Nazi Party attained power in Germany in January 1933, and very quickly began a purge of Communist and Social Democrat leaders in Germany. Following the arrest of the KPD's leader, Ernst Thälmann, Ulbricht campaigned to be Thälmann's replacement as head of the Party.

Ulbricht lived in exile in Paris and Prague from 1933 to 1937. The German Popular Front under the leadership of Heinrich Mann in Paris was dissolved after a campaign of behind-the-scenes jockeying by Ulbricht to place the organization under the control of the Comintern. Ulbricht tried to persuade the KPD founder Willi Münzenberg to go to the Soviet Union, allegedly so that Ulbricht could have "them take care of him". Münzenberg refused. He would have been in jeopardy of arrest and purge by the NKVD, a prospect in both Münzenberg's and Ulbricht's minds. Ulbricht spent some time in Spain during the Civil War, as a Comintern representative, ensuring the murder of Germans serving on the Republican side who were regarded as not sufficiently loyal to Soviet leader Joseph Stalin; some were sent to Moscow for trial, others were executed on the spot.  Ulbricht lived in the Soviet Union from 1937 to 1945, leaving from Hotel Lux to return to Germany on 30 April 1945.

At the time of the signing of the German-Soviet Non-Aggression Pact, Ulbricht and the rest of the German Communist Party supported the treaty.

Following the German invasion of the Soviet Union in June 1941, Ulbricht was active in a group of German communists under NKVD supervision (a group including, among others, the poet Erich Weinert and the writer Willi Bredel) which, among other things, translated propaganda material into German, prepared broadcasts directed at the invaders, and interrogated captured German officers.  In February 1943, following the surrender of the German Sixth Army at the close of the Battle of Stalingrad, Ulbricht, Weinert and Wilhelm Pieck conducted a Communist political rally in the center of Stalingrad which many German prisoners were forced to attend.

Post-war political career

Role in communist takeover of East Germany

In April 1945, Ulbricht led a group of party functionaries ("Ulbricht Group") into Germany to begin reconstruction of the communist party along Anti-revisionist lines. According to Grieder, "Espousing the motto 'it must look democratic but we must control everything', he set about establishing an SED dictatorship." Within the Soviet occupied zone of Germany, the Social Democrats were pressured into merging with the Communists, on Communist terms, to form the Socialist Unity Party of Germany (Sozialistische Einheitspartei Deutschlands or SED), and Ulbricht played a key role in this.

Rise to power

After the founding of the German Democratic Republic on 7 October 1949, Ulbricht became Deputy chairman (Stellvertreter des Vorsitzenden) of the Council of Ministers (Ministerrat der DDR) under Minister-President and chairman Otto Grotewohl, i.e., deputy prime minister. In 1950, as the SED restructured itself into a more orthodox Soviet-style party, he became General Secretary of the SED Central Committee, replacing Grotewohl and State President Wilhelm Pieck as co-chairmen. This position was renamed First Secretary in 1953.

Leadership of East Germany

Consolidation of authority

After the death of Stalin (whose funeral was attended by Ulbricht, Grotewohl and other German communists) in March of that year, Ulbricht's position was in danger because Moscow was considering taking a soft line regarding Germany. Ulbricht was accused of building a cult of personality around himself, with an elaborate jubilee planned for his 60th birthday on 30 June 1953, which Ulbricht later cancelled. The propaganda film Baumeister des Sozialismus – Walter Ulbricht, remained under wraps until the fall of the GDR.

The June 1953 East German uprising forced Moscow to turn to a hardliner, and his reputation as an archetypal Stalinist helped Ulbricht. On 16 June 1953, a protest erupted at East Berlin's Stalin Allee as enraged workers demanded comprehensive economic reforms. The East German police had to call in Soviet military units stationed in the city to help suppress the demonstration and communist rule was restored after several dozen deaths and 1,000 arrests. He was summoned to Moscow in July 1953, where he received the Kremlin's full endorsement as leader of East Germany. He returned to Berlin and he took the lead in calling in Soviet troops to suppress the widespread unrest with full backing from Moscow and its large army stationed inside the GDR. His position as leader of the GDR was now secure. The frustrations led many to flee to the West: over 360,000 did so in 1952 and the early part of 1953.

Ulbricht managed to rise to power despite having a peculiarly squeaky falsetto voice, the result of a bout of diphtheria in his youth. His Upper Saxon accent, combined with the high register of his voice, made his speeches sound incomprehensible at times.

Construction of a socialist society in GDR
At the third congress of the SED in 1950, Ulbricht announced a five-year plan concentrating on the doubling of industrial production. As Stalin was at that point keeping open the option of a re-unified Germany, it was not until July 1952 that the party moved towards the construction of a socialist society in East Germany. The "building of socialism" (Aufbau des Sozialismus) had begun in earnest as soon as talks of reunification faltered. By 1952, 80% of industry had been nationalized.

The Council of Ministers of East Germany decided to close the Inner German Border in May 1952. The National People's Army (NVA) was established in March 1956, an expansion of the Kasernierte Volkspolizei which been set up already in June 1952. The Stasi (MfS) was founded in 1950, rapidly expanded and employed to intensify the regime's repression of the people. The states (Länder) were effectively abolished in July 1952 and the country was governed centrally through districts.

Ulbricht uncritically followed the orthodox Stalinist model of industrialization: concentration on the development of heavy industry.

In 1957, Ulbricht arranged a visit to an East German collective farm at Trinwillershagen in order to demonstrate the GDR's modern agricultural industry to the visiting Soviet Politburo member Anastas Mikoyan. The collectivization of agriculture was completed in 1960, later than Ulbricht had expected. Following the death of President Wilhelm Pieck in 1960, the SED wrote the president's post out of the constitution. Taking its place was a collective head of state, the Council of State. Ulbricht was named its chairman, a post equivalent to that of president. His power consolidated, Ulbricht suppressed critics such as Karl Schirdewan, Ernst Wollweber, Fritz Selbmann, Fred Oelssner, Gerhart Ziller and others from 1957 onward, designated them as "factionalists" and eliminated them politically.

The Berlin Wall

Despite economic gains, emigration still continued. By 1961, 1.65 million people had fled to the west. Fearful of the possible consequences of this continued outflow of refugees, and aware of the dangers an East German collapse would present to the Eastern Bloc, Ulbricht pressured Soviet Premier Nikita Khrushchev in early 1961 to stop the outflow and resolve the status of Berlin. During this time, the refugees' mood was rarely expressed in words, though East German laborer Kurt Wismach did so effectively by shouting for free elections during one of Ulbricht's speeches.

When Khrushchev approved the building of a wall as a means to resolve this situation, Ulbricht threw himself into the project with abandon. Delegating different tasks in the process while maintaining overall supervision and careful control of the project, Ulbricht managed to keep secret the purchase of vast amounts of building materials, including barbed wire, concrete pillars, timber, and mesh wire. On 13 August 1961, work began on what was to become the Berlin Wall, only two months after Ulbricht had emphatically denied that there were such plans ("Nobody has the intention of building a wall"), thereby mentioning the word "wall" for the very first time. Ulbricht deployed GDR soldiers and police to seal the border with West Berlin overnight. The mobilization included 8,200 members of the People's Police, 3,700 members of the mobile police, 12,000 factory militia members, and 4,500 State Security officers. Ulbricht also dispersed 40,000 East German soldiers across the country to suppress any potential protests. Once the wall was in place, Berlin went from being the easiest place to cross the border between East and West Germany to being the most difficult.

The 1968 invasion by Warsaw Pact troops of Czechoslovakia and the suppression of the Prague Spring were also applauded by Ulbricht. East German soldiers were among those massed on the border but did not cross over, probably due to Czech sensitivities about German troops on their soil during World War II. It earned him a reputation as a staunch Soviet ally, in contrast to Romanian leader Nicolae Ceauşescu, who condemned the invasion.

The New Economic System
From 1963, Ulbricht and his economic adviser Wolfgang Berger attempted to create a more efficient economy through a New Economic System (Neues Ökonomisches System or NÖS). This meant that under the centrally coordinated economic plan, a greater degree of local decision-making would be possible. The reason was not only to stimulate greater responsibility on the part of companies, but also the realization that decisions were sometimes better taken locally. One of Ulbricht's principles was the "scientific" execution of politics and economy: making use of sociology and psychology but most of all the natural sciences. The effects of the NÖS, which corrected mistakes made in the past, were largely positive, with growing economic efficiency.

The New Economic System, which involved measures to end price hikes and increase access to consumer goods, was not very popular within the party, however, and from 1965 onwards opposition grew, mainly under the direction of Erich Honecker and with tacit support of Soviet leader Leonid Brezhnev. Ulbricht's preoccupation with science meant that more and more control of the economy was being relegated from the party to specialists. Also, Ulbricht's motivations were at odds with communist theory, which did not suit ideological hardliners within the Party.

Cultural and architectural policy
The communist regime demolished large numbers of important historical buildings. The Berlin Palace and the Potsdam City Palace were destroyed in 1950 and 1959. About 60 churches, including intact, rebuilt or ruined ones, were blown up, including 17 in East Berlin. The Ulrich Church in Magdeburg was razed in 1956, the Dresden Sophienkirche in 1963, the Potsdam Garrison Church in June 1968 and the fully intact Leipzig Paulinerkirche in May 1968. Citizens protesting the church demolitions were imprisoned.

Ulbricht attempted to shield the GDR from the cultural and social influences of the western world, particularly the youth culture. He intended to create the most comprehensive youth culture of the GDR, which should be largely independent of western influences.

In 1965 at the 11th Plenary Meeting of the Central Committee of the SED, he made a critical speech about copying culture from the western world by referring to the "Yeah, Yeah, Yeah" of the Beatles song: "Is it truly the case that we have to copy every dirt that comes from the West? I think, comrades, with the monotony of the yeah, yeah, yeah and whatever it is all called, yes, we should put an end to it".

Dismissal and death

By the late 1960s, Ulbricht was finding himself increasingly isolated both at home and abroad. The construction of the Berlin Wall became a public relations disaster for him, not only in the West, but even with the Eastern Bloc. This became increasingly critical as the GDR faced increasing economic problems due to his failed reforms, and other countries refused to offer any kind of assistance. His refusal to seek rapprochement with West Germany on Soviet terms, and his rejection of détente infuriated Brezhnev who, by that time, found Ulbricht's demands for greater independence from Moscow increasingly intolerable (especially in the aftermath of the Prague Spring).  One of his few victories during this time was the replacement of the GDR's original superficially liberal democratic constitution with a completely Communist document in 1968. The document formally declared East Germany to be a socialist state under the leadership of the SED, thus codifying the actual state of affairs since 1949.

During his later years, Ulbricht became increasingly stubborn and tried to assert dominance vis-a-vis other Eastern bloc countries, and even the Soviet Union. He declared at economic conferences that post-war times when East Germany had to offer other socialist countries free patents, were over once and for all and everything actually had to be paid for. Ulbricht began to believe that he had achieved something special, like Lenin and Stalin had. At the celebrations of the 50th anniversary of the October Revolution in Moscow, he untactfully boasted about having personally known Lenin and having been an active communist in the USSR already 45 years ago. In 1969 Ulbricht's Soviet guests at the State Council (Staatsrat) showed clear signs of dissatisfaction when he lectured them heavily on East Germany's supposed economic successes.

On 3 May 1971 Ulbricht was forced to resign from virtually all of his public functions "due to reasons of poor health" and was replaced, with the consent of the Soviets, by Erich Honecker. Ulbricht was allowed to remain as Chairman of the State Council, the effective head of state, and held on to this post for the rest of his life. Additionally, the honorary position of Chairman of the SED was created especially for him. Ulbricht died at a government guesthouse in Groß Dölln near Templin, north of East Berlin, on 1 August 1973, during the World Festival of Youth and Students, having suffered a stroke two weeks earlier. He was honoured with a state funeral and buried among other communists in the Zentralfriedhof Friedrichsfelde.

Legacy 

Ulbricht remained loyal to Marxist-Leninist principles throughout his life, rarely able or willing to make doctrinal compromises. Inflexible and unlikeable, a "widely-loathed Stalinist bureaucrat well known for his tactics denouncing rivals", he never attracted much public admiration. Nevertheless, he combined strategic intransigence with tactical flexibility; and until his 1971 downfall, he was able to get himself out of more than one difficult situation that defeated many communist leaders with much greater charisma than himself.

Despite stabilising the GDR to some extent, and making improvements in the national economy which were unimaginable in many other Warsaw Pact states, he never succeeded in raising East Germany's standard of living in the country to a level comparable to that in the West. Nikita Khrushchev observed, "A disparity quickly developed between the living conditions of Germans in East Germany and those in West Germany."

German historian Jürgen Kocka in 2010 summarized the consensus of scholars about the state that Ulbricht headed for its first two decades:

Personal life

Ulbricht lived in Majakowskiring, Pankow, East Berlin. He married twice: in 1920 to Martha Schmellinsky and from 1953 until his death to Lotte Ulbricht née Kühn (1903–2002). Ulbricht and Schmelinsky had a daughter in 1920, who grew up and lived separated from Ulbricht for almost her entire life. After the failure of this first marriage, he was in a relationship with Rosa Michel (born Marie Wacziarg, 1901–1990). With Michel, Ulbricht had another daughter, Rose (1931–1995).

His marriage with Lotte Kühn, his partner for most of his life (they had been together since 1935), remained childless. The couple adopted a daughter whom they named Beate. She was born in 1944 to a Ukrainian forced laborer in Leipzig. Although Beate Ulbricht remembered her father warmly, she referred to her mother in an extensive interview given to a tabloid in 1991 as "the hag," adding that she was "cold-hearted and egoistic." She also said that Walter Ulbricht was ordered to marry Lotte by Stalin.

Decorations
In 1956, Ulbricht was awarded the Hans Beimler Medal, for veterans of the Spanish Civil War, which caused controversy among other recipients, who had actually served on the front line. He was awarded the title Hero of the Soviet Union on 29 June 1963. On visiting Egypt in 1965, Ulbricht was awarded the Great Collar of the Order of the Nile by Nasser.

See also
Ivan Konev 
New Economic System
Lotte Ulbricht
Wilhelm Zaisser – tried to depose Ulbricht in 1953

Notes

Further reading
 Granville, Johanna. "The Last of the Mohicans: How Walter Ulbricht Endured the Hungarian Crisis of 1956." German Politics & Society 22.4 (73 (2004): 88–121.
 Granville, Johanna. "East Germany in 1956: Walter Ulbricht's Tenacity in the Face of Opposition." Australian Journal of Politics & History 52.3 (2006): 417–438.
 Harrison, Hope M.  Driving the Soviets Up the Wall: Soviet–East German Relations, 1953–1961. (Princeton UP, 2003) 
 Kopstein, Jeffrey. The politics of economic decline in East Germany, 1945–1989 (U of North Carolina Press, 2000).
 Long, Andrew. Berlin in the Cold War: Volume 2: The Berlin Wall 1959–1961 (2021)
 Major, Patrick, and Jonathan Osmond, eds. The workers' and peasants' state: communism and society in East Germany under Ulbricht 1945–71 ( Manchester UP, 2002).
 Stern, Carola.  Ulbricht, A Political Biography. New York: Frederick A. Praeger, 1965. Pp. xi, 231
 Sandford, Gregory W. From Hitler to Ulbricht. The Communist Reconstruction of East Germany 1945–46. Princeton, 1983
 Sample Chapter
 Ulbricht, Walter. Whither Germany? Speeches and Essays on the National Question (Dresden: Zeit im Bild Publishing House, 1967). 440 pp in English translation; a primary source.

In German
 Norbert Podewin, Walter Ulbricht: Eine neue Biographie. Dietz, Berlin 1995, .
 Mario Frank, Walter Ulbricht. Eine deutsche Biografie. 2000, Siedler-Verlag,

External links

Extracts from Walter Ulbricht — A Life for Germany, an illustrated 1968 book on Ulbricht
RFE/RL East German Subject Files: Communist Party, Blinken Open Society Archives, Budapest
 

1893 births
1973 deaths
Collars of the Order of the White Lion
Communist Party of Germany politicians
Communists in the German Resistance
Deserters
Foreign Heroes of the Soviet Union
German atheists
German Army personnel of World War I
German spies for the Soviet Union
Heroes of the Soviet Union
International Lenin School alumni
Leaders of East Germany
Members of the 1st Volkskammer
Members of the 2nd Volkskammer
Members of the 3rd Volkskammer
Members of the 4th Volkskammer
Members of the 5th Volkskammer
Members of the 6th Volkskammer
Members of the Politburo of the Central Committee of the Socialist Unity Party of Germany
Members of the Provisional Volkskammer
Members of the Reichstag of the Weimar Republic
Murders of Paul Anlauf and Franz Lenck
People from Pankow
People from the Kingdom of Saxony
People of the Cold War
Politicians from Leipzig
Recipients of the Order of Friendship of Peoples
Recipients of the Order of Lenin
Recipients of the Patriotic Order of Merit (honor clasp)
Refugees from Nazi Germany in the Soviet Union